Michelle King (née Stern; born 1958) is an American television writer and producer. She is married to Robert King, who is also her writing partner. The couple created the legal drama series The Good Wife, which earned them a Writers Guild of America Award. They have also created the comedy-drama BrainDead.

Early life
Michelle is Jewish. Her family are Holocaust survivors.

She met Robert in 1983 when as a senior at UCLA she worked part-time at FrontRunners athletic shoe store. The couple married in 1987. They have one daughter, Sophia.

Career
Michelle King, with her husband, co-created the short-lived drama series In Justice in 2006. The series aired as a mid-season replacement on ABC. As well as the pilot, King co-wrote the episode "Golden Boy". The series was not renewed after completing a thirteen episode first season.

The Kings co-created a second legal drama series entitled The Good Wife. They served as executive producers for the series. As well as the pilot episode they co-wrote the episodes "Stripped", "Unorthodox", "Hi", and twelve other episodes. King and the writing staff were nominated for a Writers Guild of America Award for Best New Series for The Good Wife.

Michelle King with her husband Robert also created and produced the thriller drama series BrainDead, which aired on CBS from June 13, 2016 to October 17, 2016 before it was cancelled. The couple then returned as showrunners on The Good Wife spin-off The Good Fight. In September 2019 their horror thriller series Evil began airing on CBS.

Filmography

Television

Awards and nominations 
King has received several nominations for her work on The Good Wife, including Best New Series from the Writers Guild of America Award, Outstanding Writing for a Drama Series and Outstanding Drama Series from the Primetime Emmy Awards.

References

External links
 

1958 births
Living people
American television producers
American women television producers
American television writers
American women television writers
Place of birth missing (living people)
Showrunners
Writers Guild of America Award winners
21st-century American screenwriters
21st-century American women writers
Jewish American screenwriters
21st-century American Jews